Tom Warhurst may refer to:

Tom Warhurst Sr. (1917–2004), Australian tennis player and Norwood footballer
Tom Warhurst Jr. (born 1963), Australian rules footballer for Norwood and Adelaide